Cover Her Face is the debut 1962 crime novel of P. D. James. It details the investigations by her poetry-writing detective Adam Dalgliesh into the death of a young, ambitious maid, surrounded by a family which has reasons to want her gone – or dead.
The title is taken from a passage from John Webster's The Duchess of Malfi: "Cover her face. Mine eyes dazzle; she died young."

Plot summary

The story opens with a dinner party hosted by Mrs. Eleanor Maxie at Martingale, a medieval manor house in the (fictional) Essex village of Chadfleet. Mrs. Maxie's son and daughter, Stephen Maxie and Deborah Riscoe, are both at the party. Serving at the party is Sally Jupp, an unmarried mother with an infant son, who was employed by Mrs. Maxie.

Deborah later goes to London and visits Stephen at the hospital where he works and sees her brother talking with Sally. Stephen says that Sally brought him some of their terminally ill father's tablets, which she found on old Mr. Maxie's bed. Stephen suspects that Mr. Maxie manages to deceive his devoted servant Martha, pretending to take his tablets when he is simply hiding them in his bed. On the day of St. Cedd's church fete, Sally announces that Stephen has asked her to marry him. The following day, Martha complains that Sally has overslept again. On entering the room, Sally's lifeless body is found. Detective Chief Inspector Adam Dalgliesh and Detective Sergeant Martin arrive and begin their investigation.

It emerges that Sally had been secretly married to James Ritchie, who has a successful job in Venezuela, but he returns to England after her death. Sally had blackmailed her uncle (who unbeknownst to her had spent her modest trust fund) into giving her 30 pounds. She had pretended to be an unmarried mother because revealing the marriage would jeopardise her husband's job and she liked to 'play with people'. She revealed Stephen Maxie's proposal of marriage for the same reason, although it is notable that she had not accepted it.

Martha had been regularly drugging Sally at night so that she would oversleep, be discredited, and eventually dismissed. It is Mrs. Eleanor Maxie who eventually confesses to the murder of Sally Jupp after Dalgliesh reveals everyone's movements on the night. It is clear, through a process of elimination, that only she could be the culprit.

The novel ends with a meeting between Adam Dalgliesh and Deborah Riscoe. It is hinted that a relationship will develop between Adam and Deborah.

The characters

Detective Chief Inspector Adam Dalgliesh – in charge of the investigation

Detective Sergeant Martin – Dalgliesh's offsider

Mrs. Eleanor Maxie – owner of Martingale, mother to Stephen and Deborah

Stephen Maxie – son of Eleanor; admires and desires Sally Jupp; doctor at St. Luke's Hospital

Deborah Riscoe – daughter of Eleanor; her husband, Edward Riscoe, died of poliomyelitis less than a year after they were married

Mr. Simon Maxie – Eleanor's invalid and elderly husband

Felix Hearne – in love with Deborah; holds both French and British decorations for his part in the WW2 resistance movement; tortured by the Gestapo

Dr. Charles Epps – a widower, long-time physician of the Maxies

Bernard Hinks – vicar of Chadfleet

Miss Alice Liddell – Warden of St. Mary's Refuge for Girls

Catherine Bowers – guest at Martingale; hopes to marry Stephen Maxie

Martha Bultitaft – the Maxie's long-time domestic servant

Sally Jupp – domestic servant at Martingale for several months; victim of homicide; lived at St. Mary's during the last five months of her pregnancy, then returned from the hospital after giving birth and stayed there till coming to work at Martingale

James Ritchie – Sally's husband

Mr. and Mrs. Proctor – Sally's aunt and uncle who raised her after her parents were killed during the Blitz

Literary significance and criticism
The novel was generally very well received by critics although the author later described it as her least favourite among her books.

"Her first detective story, immediately pleasing and impressive. The pace is deliberate, the characterization of the members of an English county family very well done, and the central character of Sally Jupp – a servant girl with imagination and a love of power – most unusual but compelling. Insp. Dalgliesh is perhaps too quietly competent in his disclosure of Sally's killer – and, despite the title, the girl isn't a Duchess of Malfi." – A Catalogue of Crime

In a 1966 book review, Anthony Boucher of The New York Times wrote "This is a literate and not unpromising first novel, but modeled firmly upon the detective story of 30 years ago at its dullest... When I keep urging a return to the formal detective story, this is not what I mean."

Adaptations
A television version of the novel was produced for Britain's ITV network in 1985. It starred Roy Marsden as Adam Dalgliesh, John Vine as Inspector John Massingham (instead of Detective Sergeant Martin), Phyllis Calvert as Eleanor Maxie, Rupert Frazer as Stephen Maxie, Mel Martin as Deborah Riscoe, Julian Glover as Felix Hearne, and Kim Thomson as Sally Jupp. As the television adaptation was set contemporaneously but the characters' ages had to remain unchanged, Felix Hearne's military service was relocated to Cyprus and a secondary storyline was added about Cypriot drug-dealers. It was filmed at Rainthorpe Hall in Norfolk.

BBC Radio 4 produced a radio serial, with Hugh Grant as Felix, Robin Ellis as Dalgliesh and Siân Phillips as Mrs Maxie, releasing it on CD shortly after airing.

References

External links

1962 British novels
Novels by P. D. James
Novels set in Essex
Faber and Faber books
British novels adapted into television shows
British detective novels
Novels adapted into radio programs
1962 debut novels